Pseudofentonia medioalbida is a species of moth of the family Notodontidae. It is found in Taiwan.

References

Moths described in 1973
Notodontidae